Georg Jensen Inc. was a gift and department store known for Scandinavian imports located in midtown Manhattan at 667 Fifth Avenue at 53rd Street from 1935-1968. In 1935, it was founded and managed by Frederik Lunning (1881-1952), re-inventing his original New York store, Georg Jensen Handmade Silver, Inc., founded 1923,  at 169 West 57th Street, across from Carnegie Hall.  Georg Jensen Inc. was the Lunnings' family business, official importers and vendors of Denmark's Georg Jensen silver. The firm distributed a glossy yearly mail-order catalog illustrated with museum-quality photographs, starting in 1936.
The Battle of the Atlantic cut off imports starting in 1939 prompting Jensen's, a major importer from Europe, to cultivate North American artisans, some of whom had emigrated from Europe, and fill their shelves with quality goods: silver jewelry, turned wood, art enamel, tiles and ceramics, lamps. With wartime materials restrictions, Jensen's launched in fall 1942 "The Lunning Collection," a modern furniture collection comprising 21 designs by Jens Risom, executed in-house, along with pieces designed and executed by Otto Christiansen. At Frederik Lunning’s death in 1952, his son Just Lunning managed Georg Jensen Inc. until his sudden death in 1965.  Georg Jensen Inc. expanded in 1966, establishing a separate furniture showroom in Manhattan and satellite stores in Manhasset and Scarsdale, New York and in Milburn and Paramus, New Jersey.  The Trustees of the  Estate of Frederik K Lunning sold all their Jensen stores in 1968, ending the Lunning era of Georg Jensen Inc. In 1978, the last of a series of successor stores and corporations declared bankruptcy.

Designers and Artists Sold by Georg Jensen Inc. 
The yearly illustrated mail-order catalogs published by Georg Jensen Inc from 1936 offer the designs of many famous artists, including Georg Jensen, Jens Risom, Dorothy Thorpe, enamelists H. Edward Winter and Karl Drerup, and Carol Janeway, silversmiths Madeleine Turner, Jo Pol, LaPaglia, wood turner Otto Christiansen, among others.

Bibliography

References

Defunct department stores of the United States
Defunct department stores based in New York City
Companies that filed for Chapter 11 bankruptcy in 1978